Fimbristylis macassarensis is a sedge of the family Cyperaceae that is native to Australia.

It blooms between February and June and produces green-brown flowers.

In Western Australia it is found on along creeks and rivers and other damp places in the Kimberley region where it grows in red sandy-clay soils often over basalt.

References

Plants described in 1855
Flora of Western Australia
macassarensis
Endemic flora of Australia
Taxa named by Ernst Gottlieb von Steudel